In mathematics, the Property P conjecture is a statement about 3-manifolds obtained by Dehn surgery on a knot in the 3-sphere. A knot in the 3-sphere is said to have Property P if every 3-manifold obtained by performing (non-trivial) Dehn surgery on the knot is not simply-connected. The conjecture states that all knots, except the unknot, have Property P.

Research on Property P was started by R. H. Bing, who popularized the name and conjecture.

This conjecture can be thought of as a first step to resolving the Poincaré conjecture, since the Lickorish–Wallace theorem says any closed, orientable 3-manifold results from Dehn surgery on a link.
If a knot  has Property P, then one cannot construct a counterexample to the Poincaré conjecture by surgery along .

A proof was announced in 2004, as the combined result of efforts of mathematicians working in several different fields.

Algebraic Formulation

See also
 Property R conjecture

References

3-manifolds
Conjectures that have been proved